The name destroying angel applies to several similar, closely related species of deadly all-white mushrooms in the genus Amanita. They are Amanita bisporigera and A. ocreata in eastern and western North America, respectively, and A. virosa in Europe.  Another European species of Amanita referred to as the destroying angel, Amanita verna - also referred to as the 'Fool's mushroom' - was first described in France in 1780.

Destroying angels are among the most toxic known mushrooms; both they and the closely related death caps (A. phalloides) contain amatoxins.

Description 
Destroying angels are characterized by having a white stalk and gills. The cap can be pure white, or white at the edge and yellowish, pinkish, or tan at the center. It has a partial veil, or ring (annulus) circling the upper stalk, and the gills are "free", not attached to the stalk. Perhaps the most telltale of the features is the presence of a volva, or universal veil, so called because it is a membrane that encapsulates the entire mushroom, rather like an egg, when it is very young. This structure  breaks as the young mushroom expands, leaving parts that can be found at the base of the stalk as a boot or cuplike structure, and there may be patches of removable material on the cap surface. This combination of features, all found together in the same mushroom, is the hallmark of the family. While other families may have any one or two of these features, none has them all. They are found singly or in small groups.

Destroying angels can be mistaken for edible fungi such as the button mushroom, meadow mushroom, or the horse mushroom. Young destroying angels that are still enclosed in their universal veil can be mistaken for puffballs, but slicing them in half longitudinally will reveal internal mushroom structures. This is the basis for the common recommendation to slice in half all puffball-like mushrooms picked when mushroom hunting. Mushroom hunters recommend that people know how to recognize both the death cap and the destroying angel in all of their forms before collecting any white gilled mushroom for consumption.

Distribution and habitat 

All Amanita species form ectomycorrhizal relationships with the roots of certain trees. Thus, destroying angels grow in or near the edges of woodlands. They can also be found on lawns or grassy meadows near trees or shrubs. Several species called destroying angel are found all over the world. Amanita bisporigera is associated with oaks and conifers.

Toxicity 
The destroying angel (Amanita bisporigera) and the death cap (Amanita phalloides) account for the overwhelming majority of deaths due to mushroom poisoning. The toxin responsible for this is amatoxin, which inhibits RNA polymerase II and III. Symptoms do not appear for 5 to 24 hours, by which time the toxins may already be absorbed and the damage (destruction of liver and kidney tissues) is irreversible. As little as half a mushroom cap can be fatal if the victim is not treated quickly enough. The symptoms include vomiting, cramps, delirium, convulsions, and diarrhea. In one study, people who had ingested the toxin were treated with "fluid and electrolyte replacement, oral activated charcoal and lactulose, IV penicillin, combined hemodialysis and hemoperfusion in two 8-hour sessions", some with "IV thioctic acid, others IV silibinin" and all received a "special diet". It was concluded that "...intensive combined treatment applied in these cases is effective in relieving patients with both moderate and severe amanitin poisoning."

See also 

List of Amanita species
List of deadly fungus species

References

External links 
 Amanita bisporigera: the destroying angel
 Experience: I nearly died after eating wild mushrooms The Guardian 13 November 2010
 I survived the “Destroying Angel” Cornell Mushroom Blog 22 November, 2006

Amanita
Hepatotoxins
Poisonous fungi
Deadly fungi
Fungus common names